The 2014 William & Mary Tribe football team represented the College of William & Mary as a member of the Colonial Athletic Association (CAA) in the 2014 NCAA Division I FCS football season. The Tribe were led by 35th-year head coach Jimmye Laycock played their home games at Zable Stadium. They finished the season 7–5 overalla nd 4–4 in CAA play to place in a four-way tie for fifth.

William & Mary's game against Towson on November 15 was Laycock's 400th game as a college football head coach. He became the 18th coach all-time and 6th active coach to accomplish this feat.

Schedule

Ranking movements

References

William and Mary
William & Mary Tribe football seasons
William and Mary Tribe football